Live + Loud is the first live album by Australian rock band Noiseworks. The album was recorded at The Palms Crown Casino, Australia in October 2007. The album includes one new track "Let It Go" and was released in 2008.

Track listing
 CD/ DD (NW08-LIVE)
 "Touch" - 5:24
 "Burning Feeling" - 4:04
 "Love Somebody" - 4:41
 "Simple Man" - 4:23
 "Miles & Miles" - 4:19
 "Let It Go" - 3:41
 "Keep Me Running" - 5:14
 "Everyday People" - 5:40
 "R.I.P. (Millie)" - 4:57
 "Voice Of Reason" - 4:27
 "No Lies" - 4:00
 "Take Me Back" - 4:42
 "Freedom" - 5:31
 "Hot Chilli Woman" - 3:37
 "Rock N Roll" - 1:47

Credits
 Art Direction, Design – Gino Campagnaro
 Bass, Executive-Producer – Steve Balbi
 Drums – Kevin Nicol
 Guitar – Stuart Fraser
 Keyboards – Scott Aplin
 Mastered By – Paul Gomersall
 Mixed By – Tony Wall
 Vocals, Executive-Producer – Jon Stevens

References

2008 live albums
Noiseworks albums
Self-released albums